To Kill a Child (Swedish: Att döda ett barn) is a 2003 Swedish-Finnish short drama film written and directed by Alexander Skarsgård and Björne Larson, and based on Stig Dagerman's novella Att döda ett barn.

Plot
A man is on his way to the ocean. A child is running through a backyard. In four minutes their fates will intertwine. One life will be changed forever whilst the other's flame will burn out.

About the film
The film premiered on 7 February 2003 and has also been shown on Swedish Television.

Cast
Valter Skarsgård - The Child
Christer Fjellström - The Father  
Evalena Ljung Kjellberg - The Mother  
Jonas Sjöqvist - The Man
Sofia Zouagui - The Woman
Stellan Skarsgård - Narrator

Awards
2003 Odense International Film Festival - Grand Prix: Alexander Skarsgård and Björne Larson
2003 Odense International Film Festival - Press Award: Alexander Skarsgård and Björne Larson

External links

References 

Swedish short films
Swedish drama films
Finnish drama films
Finnish short films
Films based on short fiction
2003 drama films
2003 films
2000s Swedish films